Marc Davis (born June 23, 1990) is an American former stock car racing developmental driver for Joe Gibbs Racing (JGR). Davis graduated from Mooresville Christian Academy in May 2008.

Racing career
Davis grew up in Colesville, Maryland as the son of an F-1 boat racer. He began competing in BMX, achieving US-2 and Gold Cup #1 rankings. He moved to quarter midgets at age 8, followed by Junior Dragsters. He spent three years racing Bandoleros before moving to legends. At age 13 he was in this third year racing legends when he won two 2003 national legends car championships in the Dirt and Road Course Young Lion divisions, becoming the first champion to win both championships in the same season.  He moved to Mooresville, North Carolina to pursue a career in racing. He won six of twelve limited late model races for JGR at Hickory Motor Speedway in 2006. His March 25, 2006 victory at the track was the track's second victory by an African American.

In 2007 he recorded a season best second-place finish, five top fives, and seven top 10 finishes in thirteen events. He finished ninth in points. He also competed in his first ARCA event, finishing fourth for veteran Bill Venturini. He is scheduled to racing the Camping World East in 2008 along with four ARCA events. He rang the closing bell at the New York Stock Exchange on February 6, 2008 for Black History Month. He made his major league NASCAR debut late in 2008, driving the #81 Randy Moss Motorsports Chevrolet at Gateway International Raceway in the Craftsman Truck Series. He finished 16th.

Davis then finished the 2008 Camping World East season with a top-ten finish in Irwindale at the Toyota All-Star Showdown.

In 2009, Davis drove selected races in both the Nationwide Series and Camping World Truck Series for his own team. In Nationwide, Davis made 5 attempts and qualified for 4 races in the #10/#36 Toyota with a best finish of 25th at Nashville Superspeedway. In the Truck Series, he attempted and qualified for 2 races in the #19 Chevrolet, finishing 18th at Martinsville and 32nd at Homestead.

In 2010, Davis would pull out of the Nationwide Series race at Daytona due to the death of his father. He was scheduled to race for Xxxtreme Motorsport in their #58 Chevrolet. Davis would make one start in 2010, at Dover finishing 23rd.

Davis returned to NASCAR in 2011, start and parking the #03 for R3 Motorsports.

Personal life
Davis currently works for Hendrick BMW in North Carolina.

Motorsports career results

NASCAR
(key) (Bold – Pole position awarded by qualifying time. Italics – Pole position earned by points standings or practice time. * – Most laps led.)

Nationwide Series

Camping World Truck Series

 Season still in progress
 Ineligible for series points

K&N Pro Series East

Camping World West Series

ARCA Re/Max Series
(key) (Bold – Pole position awarded by qualifying time. Italics – Pole position earned by points standings or practice time. * – Most laps led.)

 Season still in progress
 Ineligible for series points

References

External links
 Official Website
 
 Official MySpace

1990 births
African-American racing drivers
Living people
NASCAR drivers
People from Colesville, Maryland
People from Silver Spring, Maryland
Racing drivers from Maryland
ARCA Menards Series drivers
21st-century African-American sportspeople
Joe Gibbs Racing drivers